November is the eleventh month of the year.

November may also refer to:

Film and television 
 November (2004 film), an American film starring Courteney Cox
 November (2017 film), an Estonian film
 November (2021 film), an upcoming Maldivian film
 November (2022 film), a French film written and directed by Cédric Jimenez
 November (Dollhouse), a character in the TV series Dollhouse

Literature
November (novella), an 1842 novella by Gustave Flaubert
November (play), a 2008 play by David Mamet
"November", a poem by Simon Armitage

Music
November (band), an early 1970s Swedish hard rock band

Albums
November (John Abercrombie album) or the title song, 1993
November (Sir album), 2018
November (EP), by Azure Ray, or the title song, 2002
November, by Bizzey, 2018
November, by Odd Nordstoga, or the title song, 2010

Songs
"November" (song), by Juli, 2005
"November", by Christie Front Drive from Christie Front Drive, 1997
"November", by Emerson Drive from What If?, 2004
"November", by Max Richter from Memoryhouse, 2002
"November", by Silverstein from When Broken Is Easily Fixed, 2003
"November", by Tom Waits from The Black Rider, 1993
"November", by Tyler, The Creator from Flower Boy, 2017

People
Steve November (born 1972), British television producer
Siphesihle November (born 1998 or 1999) is a South African ballet dancer

Other uses
November (Roman month), the ninth month of the Roman calendar
November-class submarine, a class of Soviet nuclear-powered attack submarines
N, in the NATO phonetic alphabet
November, a character in the webcomic No Rest for the Wicked

See also

Novembre (disambiguation)
Noviembre (film), a 2003 Spanish film directed by Achero Mañas